Events from the year 1611 in Sweden

Incumbents
 Monarch – Charles IX, then Gustaf II Adolf

Events

 - Swedish conquest of Korela Fortress.
 - Armistice with Poland. 
 - Kalmar War

Births

 24 June - Johan Oxenstierna, statesman (died 1657)

Deaths

 30 October - Charles IX of Sweden, monarch  (born 1550) 
 - Elin i Horsnäs, alleged witch
 - Princess Sophia of Sweden, princess

References

 
Years of the 17th century in Sweden
Sweden